Kenny Van Hoevelen (born 24 June 1983 in Mechelen, is a Belgian  football (soccer) centre back who currently plays for Mariekerke-Branst in the Belgian Provincial Leagues. His previous clubs include Westerlo, KV Mechelen, RKC Waalwijk, Oud-Heverlee Leuven and Eendracht Aalst.

External links
 Voetbal International profile 
 Guardian Football
 

Living people
1983 births
Sportspeople from Mechelen
Footballers from Antwerp Province
Belgian footballers
Belgian Pro League players
Challenger Pro League players
Eredivisie players
K.V.C. Westerlo players
K.V. Mechelen players
RKC Waalwijk players
Oud-Heverlee Leuven players
S.C. Eendracht Aalst players
Association football defenders